Prince Karl Anton of Hohenzollern-Sigmaringen (7 September 1811 – 2 June 1885) was the last prince of Hohenzollern-Sigmaringen before the territory was annexed by the Kingdom of Prussia in 1849. Afterwards he continued to be titular prince of his house and, with the death of the last prince of Hohenzollern-Hechingen in 1869, of the entire House of Hohenzollern. He served as Minister President of Prussia from 1858 to 1862, the only Hohenzollern prince to hold the post. His second son, Karl, became king of Romania. The offer of the throne of Spain to his eldest son Leopold was one of the causes of the Franco-Prussian War that led to the unification of Germany and the creation of the German Empire.

Family and studies 
Karl Anton was born at Krauchenwies Castle in Sigmaringen, the second child of Karl, Prince of Hohenzollern-Sigmaringen (1785–1853) and the French princess Marie Antoinette Murat (1793–1847). Karl Anton studied law in Geneva, at the Universities of Tübingen and Göttingen, and at the Humboldt University of Berlin. After finishing school he was active in the Estates Assembly (a form of parliament) and in the administration of Hohenzollern-Sigmaringen.

On 31 October 1834 he married Princess Josephine of Baden (1813–1900), daughter of Grand Duke Carl of Baden. They had six children:

 Leopold (1835–1905) – was offered but did not take the throne of Spain
 Stephanie (1837–1859) – married Peter V of Portugal
 Karl (1839–1914) – King of Romania (1881 – 1914)
 Anton (1841–1866) – died in battle during the Austro-Prussian War
 Friedrich (1843–1904)
 Marie (1845–1912) – married Prince Philippe of Belgium and became the mother of King Albert I of Belgium.

Princeship and abdication 
On 27 August 1848, in the face of the events surrounding the German revolutions of 1848–1849, Prince Karl resigned in favor of his son, Karl Anton, who originally intended to renounce the sovereign rights of the state. He negotiated with the provisional government of the Frankfurt Parliament, but the negotiations did not lead to any results. Within the principality, the revolutionary movement became increasingly radicalized, leading to a dispute with the estates over the princely domains that forced Karl Anton to temporarily leave Hohenzollern-Sigmaringen.

In the spring of 1849, the situation in Sigmaringen again came to a head. Prince Karl Anton had to consent to the new Frankfurt Constitution that attempted to set up a German constitutional monarchy under King Frederick Wilhelm IV of Prussia. On 3 June a people's assembly was held calling for the unification of the military and the citizen army, the free election of officers, and the transfer of the princely domains to the state. At Karl Anton's request, Prussian troops entered Sigmaringen and all of Hohenzollern on 3 August.

Beginning in the spring of 1848, Karl Anton conducted secret negotiations with Frederick William IV on the annexation of the principality to the Kingdom of Prussia. On 7 December 1849, Prince Karl Anton signed the state treaty with Prussia, and the solemn handover of the principality took place on 6 April 1850.

After abdicating as sovereign in favor of Prussia, Karl Anton became commander of the 14th Division of the Prussian Army on 15 April 1852. He lived with his family in Jägerhof Palace in Düsseldorf. On 22 March 1853 he was promoted to lieutenant general. At the beginning of the Crimean War, he was sent as an envoy to Paris to try to prevent the anti-Russian coalition that France and Great Britain ultimately formed.

Minister President of Prussia 

Karl Anton had good relations with Prince Wilhelm of Prussia. After Wilhelm assumed the regency on 5 November 1858, he entrusted Karl Anton with office of Minister President of Prussia and asked him to submit his proposal for building a ministry. The appointment made him head of the government during the "New Era", a period of attempted reform following the conservative reaction against the 1848 revolutions.

Politically Karl Anton was close to the moderate liberalism of the  Party, an association of Prussian liberal-conservative politicians led by August von Bethmann-Hollweg. In domestic politics, Karl Anton attempted to implement liberal reforms and initially cooperated with the liberals who were in the majority in the Prussian House of Representatives. In the conflict over military reform that pitted King Wilhelm I against the parliament, Karl Anton supported the King and the plans of Minister of War Albrecht von Roon, but he also advocated a greater opening of an officer's career to the middle classes. In foreign policy, he supported the liberal reform plans that had the goal of unifying the German states. The European crisis resulting from the Second Italian War of Independence caused his plans for German policy to fail.

Between 22 November 1858 and 28 June 1860, Karl Anton served as commanding general of the VII Army Corps; on 31 May 1859 he attained the rank of general of infantry.

The parliamentary election of 1861 ended with the victory of the German Progress Party, which rejected Roon's military plans. As a result, Karl Anton lost political support in the chamber. Within the cabinet, he had difficulty asserting himself between the liberal members around August von der Heydt and the conservatives around Roon. His time as Minister President ended on 12 March 1862.

Final years 

After leaving the Prussian government, Karl Anton largely resigned from active politics and focused on his role as head of the Catholic branch of the Hohenzollern family, a position that was accentuated by the extinction of the Hohenzollern-Hechingen line in 1869. In 1866 his son Karl was elected Prince of Romania. When in February 1870 his other son Leopold was offered the Spanish throne, German Chancellor Otto von Bismarck urged Karl Anton to accept the offer, which he did after a period of hesitation. In view of his kinship with the French houses of Murat and Bonaparte, the approval of the French emperor Napoleon III seemed possible. When the candidacy threatened to ignite a European crisis, Karl Anton withdrew his son's name on 12 July 1870, but it was not enough to prevent the Franco-Prussian War of 1870/71. The Ems Dispatch, which incited France to declare war on Prussia, was issued one day later. During the war, Karl Anton did not hold a frontline command. He was military governor of the Rhine Province and the Province of Westphalia, with the rank of commanding general.

In 1871 Sigmaringen again became Karl Anton's permanent residence. He and his wife celebrated their golden wedding anniversary in 1884 with a thirteen-course meal. The prince was an avid hunter and a collector of art, books and guns, as well as an enthusiastic amateur antiquarian who offered guided tours of his collections and art treasures in Sigmaringen Castle. He spent the last years of his life burdened by a paralysis of the legs. 

Karl Anton died on 2 June 1885.

Honors
German decorations

Foreign decorations

Ancestry

References 

1811 births
1885 deaths
People from Sigmaringen
Princes of Hohenzollern-Sigmaringen
Princes of Hohenzollern
Members of the Prussian House of Lords
Prime Ministers of Prussia
Colonel generals of Prussia
19th-century Prussian military personnel
German landowners
Recipients of the Pour le Mérite (military class)
Grand Crosses of the Order of Saint Stephen of Hungary
Knights of the Golden Fleece of Austria
Grand Croix of the Légion d'honneur
Recipients of the Order of the White Eagle (Russia)
Recipients of the Order of St. Anna, 1st class
Grand Crosses of the Order of the Star of Romania
Grand Crosses of the Order of the Crown (Romania)
Grand Crosses of the Order of Saint-Charles
Royal reburials